House of Forbidden Secrets is a 2013 American horror film directed by Todd Sheets, with a score created by Fabio Frizzi.

History
The film was shot in multiple locations in Kansas City, Missouri. The music was composed by Fabio Frizzi. The national premiere was in Las Vegas, Nevada, at the PollyGrind Film Festival on October 11, 2013, where it won six awards. In 2014 House of Forbidden Secrets screened in several more locations in the United States.

Plot
Jacob Hunt has had some very bad breaks in life. His wife left him, his friends have all abandoned him, and his children barely see him! Jacob has been given an amazing gift and the chance he needs to get back on his feet and start anew. Jacob has landed the job of overnight security officer at the old ShadowView Manor. It has now been turned into a commercial office and retail building. Jacob is about to learn nights around the old Manor contains many secrets. A dark past that is breaking through the boundaries of time, leaking into this dimension. As luck would have it, Jacob's first night on the job is the anniversary of a dark tragedy that has stained the building.

Cast

References

External links 
 
 
 Kansas City Pitch Article

2010s English-language films